The 1949 Tour de Hongrie was the 14th edition of the Tour de Hongrie cycle race and was held from 29 June to 3 July 1949. The race started and finished in Budapest. The race was won by André Labeylie.

Route

General classification

References

1949
Tour de Hongrie
Tour de Hongrie